Mizerów  is a village in the administrative district of Gmina Suszec, within Pszczyna County, Silesian Voivodeship, in southern Poland.

The village has a population of 1,326.

References

Villages in Pszczyna County